Morris Park is a neighborhood in the Nokomis community in Minneapolis, Minnesota. Its boundaries are 54th Street to the north, 46th Avenue to the east, the Twin Cities Air Force Base to the south, and 34th Avenue to the west. It shares a neighborhood organization with the Keewaydin, Minnehaha, and Wenonah neighborhoods, which are collectively referred to as Nokomis East and served by the Nokomis East Neighborhood Association (NENA).

References

External links
Minneapolis Neighborhood Profile - Morris Park
Nokomis East Neighborhood Association

Neighborhoods in Minneapolis